Charles Mnene (born 11 December 1985) is a British film, television and stage actor.

Mnene's television appearances include guest roles in The Bill, Holby City, Doctors and the drama Ahead of the Class, with Julie Walters, plus several films and stage productions.

His first screen experience was in Thomas Clay's The Great Ecstasy of Robert Carmichael, which caused a stir at Cannes International Film Festival in 2005. He also landed the role of Demetrios in Martha Fiennes' feature film Chromophobia. In 2006, Mnene stirred more controversy in the BAFTA award-winning drama Shoot the Messenger, alongside David Oyelowo and in 2008's Fallout, written by Roy Williams, in which he plays a gang leader who murders one of his classmates.

He has continued to appear in films, stage and television work, including Richard Jobson's New Town Killers, and in writer-director Paul Wilkins' 7 Lives.

Filmography

References

External links

Male actors from London
Black British male actors
Living people
1985 births
People from the London Borough of Brent
People from Nairobi
Kenyan emigrants to the United Kingdom
21st-century British male actors